The PDP-11 architecture is a CISC instruction set architecture (ISA) developed by Digital Equipment Corporation (DEC). It is implemented by central processing units (CPUs) and microprocessors used in PDP-11 minicomputers. It was in wide use during the 1970s, but was eventually overshadowed by the more powerful VAX architecture in the 1980s.

Memory

Data formats
Sixteen-bit words are stored little-endian (with least significant bytes first). Thirty-two-bit data—supported as extensions to the basic architecture, e.g., floating point in the FPU Instruction Set, double-words in the Extended Instruction Set or long data in the Commercial Instruction Set—are stored in more than one format, including an unusual middle-endian format sometimes referred to as "PDP-endian".

Memory management
The PDP-11's 16-bit addresses can address 64 KB. By the time the PDP-11 yielded to the VAX, 8-bit bytes and hexadecimal notation were becoming standard in the industry; however, numeric values on the PDP-11 always use octal notation, and the amount of memory attached to a PDP-11 is always stated as a number of words. The basic logical address space is 32K words, but the high 4K of physical address space (addresses 160000 through 177777 in the absence of memory management) are not populated because input/output registers on the bus respond to addresses in that range. So originally, a fully expanded PDP-11 had 28K words, or 56 kbytes in modern terms.

The processor reserves low memory addresses for two-word vectors that give a program counter and processor status word with which to begin a service routine. When an I/O device interrupts a program, it places the address of its vector on the bus to indicate which service routine should take control. The lowest vectors are service routines to handle various types of trap. Traps occur on some program errors, such as an attempt to execute an undefined instruction; and also when the program executes an instruction such as BPT, EMT, IOT, or TRAP to request service from the operating system.

Memory expansion
During the life of the PDP-11, the 16-bit logical address space became an increasing limitation.  Various techniques were used to work around it:
Later-model PDP-11 processors include memory management to support virtual addressing. The physical address space was extended to 18 or 22 bits, hence allowing up to 256 KB or 4 MB of RAM. The logical address space (that is, the address space available at any moment without changing the memory mapping table) remains limited to 16 bits.
Some models, beginning with the PDP-11/45, can be set to use 32K words (64 KB) as the "instruction space" for program code and a separate 32K words of "data space". Some operating systems—notably Unix since edition V7, and RSX11-M+—rely on this feature.
Programming techniques, such as overlaying a block of stored instructions or data with another as needed, can conceal paging issues from the application programmer. For example, the Modula-2 compiler produces code under which the run-time system swaps 8 Kb pages into memory as individual procedures receive control.

CPU registers

The CPU contains eight general-purpose 16-bit registers (R0 to R7). Register R7 is the program counter (PC). Although any register can be used as a stack pointer, R6 is the stack pointer (SP) used for hardware interrupts and traps. R5 is often used to point to the current procedure call frame. To speed up context switching, some PDP-11 models provide dual R1-R5 register sets. Kernel, Supervisor (where present), and User modes have separate memory maps, and also separate stack pointers (so that a user program cannot cause the system to malfunction by storing an invalid value in the stack pointer register).

Addressing modes
Most instructions allocate six bits to specify an operand. Three bits select one of eight addressing modes, and three bits select a general register.

The encoding of the six bit operand addressing mode is as follows:

In the following sections, each item includes an example of how the operand would be written in assembly language. Rn means one of the eight registers, written R0 through R7.

General register addressing modes
The following eight modes can be applied to any general register. Their effects when applied to R6 (the stack pointer, SP) and R7 (the program counter, PC) are set out separately in the following sections.

In index and index deferred modes, X is a 16-bit value taken from a second word of the instruction. In double-operand instructions, both operands can use these modes.  Such instructions are three words long.

Autoincrement and autodecrement operations on a register are by 1 in byte instructions, by 2 in word instructions, and by 2 whenever a deferred mode is used, since the quantity the register addresses is a (word) pointer.

Program counter addressing modes
When R7 (the program counter) is specified, four of the addressing modes naturally yield useful effects:

The only common use of absolute mode, whose syntax combines immediate and deferred mode, is to specify input/output registers, as the registers for each device have specific memory addresses. Relative mode has a simpler syntax and is more typical for referring to program variables and jump destinations. A program that uses relative mode (and relative deferred mode) exclusively for internal references is position-independent; it contains no assumptions about its own location, so it can be loaded into an arbitrary memory location, or even moved, with no need for its addresses to be adjusted to reflect its location (relocated). In computing such addresses relative to the current location, the processor performed relocation on the fly.

Immediate and absolute modes are merely autoincrement and autoincrement deferred mode, respectively, applied to PC. When the auxiliary word is "in the instruction" as the above table says, the PC for the next instruction is automatically incremented past the auxiliary word. As PC always points to words, the autoincrement operation is always by 2.

Stack addressing modes
R6, also written SP, is used as a hardware stack for traps and interrupts. A convention enforced by the set of modes the PDP-11 provides is that a stack grows downward—toward lower addresses—as items are pushed onto it. When a mode is applied to SP, or to any register the programmer elects to use as a software stack, the addressing modes have the following effects:

Although software stacks can contain bytes, SP is always a stack of words. Autoincrement and autodecrement operations on SP is always by 2.

Instruction set
The PDP-11 operates on bytes and words. Bytes are specified by a register number—identifying the register's low-order byte—or by a memory location. Words are specified by a register number or by the memory location of the low-order byte, which must be an even number. In most instructions that take operands, bit 15 is set to specify byte addressing, or clear to specify word addressing. In the lists in the following two sections, the assembly-language programmer appended B to the instruction symbol to specify a byte operation; for example, MOV became MOVB.

A few instructions, for example MARK and SOB, were not implemented on some PDP-11 models.

Double-operand instructions
The high-order four bits specify the operation to be performed (with bit 15 generally selecting word versus byte addressing). Two groups of six bits specify the source operand addressing mode and the destination operand addressing mode, as defined above.

The ADD and SUB instructions use word addressing, and have no byte-oriented variations.

Some two-operand instructions utilize an addressing mode operand and an additional register operand:

Where a register pair is used (written below as "(Reg, Reg+1)", the first register contains the low-order portion of the operand and must be an even numbered register. The next higher numbered register contains the high-order portion of the operand (or the remainder). An exception is the multiply instruction; Reg may be odd, but if it is, the high 16 bits of the result are not stored.

Single-operand instructions
The high-order ten bits specify the operation to be performed, with bit 15 generally selecting byte versus word addressing. A single group of six bits specifies the operand as defined above.

Branch instructions
In most branch instructions, whether the branch is taken is based on the state of the condition codes. A branch instruction is typically preceded by a two-operand CMP (compare) or BIT (bit test) or a one-operand TST (test) instruction. Arithmetic and logic instructions also set the condition codes. In contrast to Intel processors in the x86 architecture, MOV instructions set them too, so a branch instruction could be used to branch depending on whether the value moved was zero or negative.

The high-order byte of the instruction specifies the operation. Bits 9 through 15 are the op-code, and bit 8 is the value of the condition code calculation which results in the branch being taken. The low-order byte is a signed word offset relative to the current location of the program counter. This allows for forward and reverse branches in code.

The limited range of the branch instructions meant that, as code grew, the target addresses of some branches would become unreachable. The programmer would change the one-word BR to the two-word JMP instruction from the next group. As JMP has no conditional forms, the programmer would change BEQ to a BNE that branched around a JMP.

SOB (Subtract One and Branch) is another conditional branch instruction. The specified register is decremented by 1, and if the result is not zero, a reverse branch is taken based on the 6 bit word offset.

Subroutine instructions

The JSR instruction could save any register on the stack. Programs that did not need this feature specified PC as the register (JSR PC, address) and the routine returned using RTS PC. If a routine were called with, for instance, "JSR R4, address", then the old value of R4 would be on the top of the stack and the return address (just after JSR) would be in R4. This let the routine gain access to values coded in-line by specifying (R4)+, or to in-line pointers by specifying @(R4)+. The autoincrementation moved past these data, to the point at which the caller's code resumed. Such a routine would have to specify RTS R4 to return to its caller.

Trap instructions

Trap and Exception Vector Address Assignments

Miscellaneous instructions

Condition-code operations

The four condition codes in the processor status word (PSW) are
N indicating a negative value
Z indicating a zero (equal) condition
V indicating an overflow condition, and
C indicating a carry condition.

Instructions in this group were what Digital called "micro-programmed": A single bit in the instruction word referenced a single condition code. The assembler did not define syntax to specify every combination, but the symbols SCC and CCC assembled an instruction that set or cleared, respectively, all four condition codes.

Clearing or setting none of the condition codes (opcodes 000240 and 000260, respectively) could effectively be considered as no-operation instructions. In fact, the NOP mnemonic assembled into 000240.

Inconsistent instructions
Over the life of the PDP-11, subtle differences arose in the implementation of instructions and combinations of addressing modes, though no implementation was regarded as correct. The inconsistencies did not affect ordinary use of the PDP-11.

Optional instruction sets

Extended Instruction Set (EIS)
The EIS is an option for 11/35/40 and 11/03, and is standard on newer processors.
MUL, DIV multiply and divide integer operand to register pair
ASH, ASHC arithmetic - shift a register or a register pair. For a positive number it will shift left, and right for a negative one.

Floating Instruction Set (FIS)
The FIS instruction set is an option for the PDP-11/35/40 and 11/03. Single-precision operating on a stack addressed by a register operand. The high-order 13 bits specify the operation to be performed. A three bit field specifies which register is used as the floating point operand stack pointer. Each float is two words and each floating point instruction operates on two floats, returning one float as a result. The selected stack pointer is incremented by a stride of 4 after each operation.

Floating Point Processor (FPP)
This was the optional floating point processor option for 11/45 and most subsequent models.

full floating point operations on single- or double-precision operands, selected by single/double bit in Floating Point Status Register
single-precision floating point data format predecessor of IEEE 754 format: sign bit, 8-bit exponent, 23-bit mantissa with hidden bit 24

Commercial Instruction Set (CIS)
The Commercial Instruction Set, known as CIS or CIS11, adds string and binary coded decimal (BCD) instructions used by COBOL and DIBOL. It was implemented by optional microcode in the 11/23/24, and by an add-in module in the 11/44 and one version of the 11/74.

Strings are represented by two 16-bit integers stored in any two of the general-purpose registers, or as two 16-bit values in subsequent locations in memory. One is designated "n", which is the length up to 64 kB, and the other "A", which is a pointer to the start of the character data in memory. Together, an n/A pair indicates the location and length of the string. The basic operations are MOVEC, MOVTC and MOVRC, which move the character data in memory from the location indicated in one n/A pair to the location in a second n/A. MOVECI, MOVTCI and MOVRCI did the same but with the locations indicated by n/A pairs in memory instead of registers. MOVEC/MOVECI simply copies the data from one location to another. MOVRC/MOVRCI reverses the original string into the destination. In all of the move instructions, if the source is shorter than the destination, the destination is padded, if the source is longer, it is truncated. If either occurs, the processor status flags are used to indicate this.

MOVTC/MOVTCI translates characters during copy using a 256-byte lookup table held in a third n/A pair, with the A pointing to the start of the table and the lower eight bits of n being an ASCII code used to fill the destination string if the source string is shorter. Translations use the source string's ASCII value as an index number and copy the value in the translation table at that index into the destination string. This can be used for EBCDIC conversions, for instance, by placing the corresponding EBCDIC character code for the mapped ASCII codes in the table. The character "E" is character 69 in ASCII and 197 in EBCDIC, so to convert EBCDIC to ASCII one would make a table of 256 bytes with a 69 in location 197. When MOVTC is called and sees a 197 in the original string, it will output 97 in the new string, performing the conversion.

String comparisons are handled by CMPC, which sets the processor condition codes based on the results of comparing two strings. LOCC finds the first occurrence of a character in a string, while SKPC searches for the first character that does not match, used for trimming blanks at the start of strings, for instance. SCANC and SPANC are similar to LOCC and SKPC, but match any character in a masked character set. This can be used, for instance, to find the next occurrence of any line-breaking character like VT, LF or CR. Character sets are a table of 256 bytes, split into subsets. These are similar to the translation tables with the lower eight bits of the first word forming a mask, and the second word pointing to the start of the table. The mask selects which of the subsets, up to eight, are part of the character set during comparisons. Using this system, one can define character sets like uppercase, lowercase, digits, etc. and then easily make a union via the mask, for instance, selecting the upper and lowercase subsets to produce the complete set of letters.

CIS also includes a set of data types and instructions for manipulating BCD numbers. This data is also represented by two 16-bit registers or memory locations, with the second number being the A identical to the string case. The first word now contains four fields which describe the string representation of the data, which include packed and unpacked digits, handling the sign, and the length of the string, from 0 to 16. DEC referred to unpacked data, with one digit per byte, as "numeric strings". Using packed data, with two BCD digits per byte, a 16-word string held BDC numbers up to 32 digits long. Instructions included ADDP/ADDN for packed and unpacked data, SUBP/SUBN, ASHP/ASHN (arithmetic shift) and CMPP/CMPN (compare). Available for packed data only are MULP and DIVP. It also includes a set of instructions to convert BCD numbers between packed and unpacked formats, as well as to and from binary values.

A final set of instructions is used to load string and BCD data to and from the internal registers, avoiding the need for bit-fiddling in code.

Access to Processor Status Word (PSW)
The PSW is mapped to memory address 177 776, and can thus be processed like any data. Instructions found on all but the earliest PDP-11s give programs more direct access to the register.
SPL (set priority level)
MTPS (move to Processor Status)
MFPS (move from Processor Status)

Access to other memory spaces
On PDP-11s that provide multiple instruction spaces and data spaces, a set of non-orthogonal Move instructions give access to other spaces. For example, routines in the operating system that handle run-time service calls use these instructions to exchange information with the caller.
MTPD (move to previous data space)
MTPI (move to previous instruction space)
MFPD (move from previous data space)
MFPI (move from previous instruction space)

Speed
PDP-11 processor speed varies by model, memory configuration, op code, and addressing modes. Instruction timings have up to three components, execute/fetch of the instruction itself and access time for the source and the destination. The last two components depend on the addressing mode. For example, on the PDP-11/70 (circa 1975), an instruction of the form ADD x(Rm),y(Rn) had a fetch/execute time of 1.35 microseconds plus source and destination times of 0.6 microseconds each, for a total instruction time of 2.55 microseconds. Any case where addressed memory is not in the cache adds 1.02 microseconds.  The register-to-register ADD Rm,Rn can execute from the cache in 0.3 microseconds. Floating point is even more complex, since there is some overlap between the CPU and the floating-point processor, but in general, floating point is significantly slower. A single-precision floating add instruction ranges from 2.4 to 5.5 microseconds plus time to fetch the operands.

Interrupts
The PDP-11 operates at a priority level from 0 through 7, specified by three bits in the Processor Status Word (PSW), and high-end models can operate in a choice of modes, Kernel (privileged), User (application), and sometimes Supervisor, according to two bits in the PSW.

To request an interrupt, a bus device asserts one of four common bus lines, BR4 through BR7, until the processor responds. Higher numbers indicated greater urgency, perhaps that data might be lost or a desired sector might rotate out of contact with the read/write heads unless the processor responds quickly. The printer's readiness for another character is the lowest priority (BR4), as it can remain ready indefinitely. If the processor is operating at level 5, then BR6 and BR7 would be in order. If the processor is operating at 3 or lower, it will grant any interrupt; if at 7, it will grant none. Bus requests that are not granted are not lost but merely deferred.  The device needing service continues to assert its bus request.

Whenever an interrupt exceeds the processor's priority level, the processor asserts the corresponding bus grant, BG4 through BG7. The bus-grant lines are not common lines but are a daisy chain: The input of each gate is the output of the previous gate in the chain. A gate is on each bus device, and a device physically closer to the processor is earlier in the daisy chain. If the device has made a request, then on sensing its bus-grant input, it concludes it is in control of the bus, and does not pass the grant signal to the next device on the bus. If the device has not made a request, it propagates its bus-grant input to its bus-grant output, giving the next closest device the chance to reply. (If devices do not occupy adjacent slots to the processor board, "grant continuity cards" inserted into the empty slots propagate the bus-grant line.)

Once in control of the bus, the device drops its bus request and places on the bus the memory address of its two-word vector. The processor saves the program counter (PC) and PSW, enters Kernel mode, and loads new values from the specified vector. For a device at BR6, the new PSW in its vector typically specifies 6 as the new processor priority, so the processor will honor more urgent requests (BR7) during the service routine, but defer requests of the same or lower priority. With the new PC, the processor jumps to the service routine for the interrupting device. That routine operates the device, at least removing the condition that caused the interrupt. The routine ends with the RTI (ReTurn from Interrupt) instruction, which restores PC and PSW as of just before the processor granted the interrupt.

If a bus request is made in error and no device responds to the bus grant, the processor times out and performs a trap that suggests bad hardware.

MACRO-11 assembly language

MACRO-11 is the assembly language for the PDP-11. It is the successor to PAL-11 (Program Assembler Loader), an earlier version of the PDP-11 assembly language without macro facilities. MACRO-11 is supported on all DEC PDP-11 operating systems. PDP-11 Unix systems also include an assembler (called "as"), structurally similar to MACRO-11, but with different syntax and fewer features.

Notes

References

Further reading

Michael Singer, PDP-11. Assembler Language Programming and Machine Organization, John Wiley & Sons, NY: 1980.

External links
PDP-11 Processor Handbook (Gordon Bell's 1969 edition, 1979 edition at bitsavers )
Preserving the PDP-11 Series of 16-bit minicomputers
Gordon Bell and Bill Strecker's 1975 paper, What We Learned From the PDP-11
Ersatz-11, a PDP-11 emulator
Further papers and links on Gordon Bell's site.
The Fuzzball

PDP-11
Instruction set architectures